The Aaron Hilton Site is a historic archaeological site located near Charles City, Charles City County, Virginia. The site includes the remains of a simple house built between 1870 and 1877 for Aaron Hilton, a respected former slave.

It was added to the National Register of Historic Places in 1997.

References 

African-American history of Virginia
Archaeological sites on the National Register of Historic Places in Virginia
Buildings and structures in Charles City County, Virginia
National Register of Historic Places in Charles City County, Virginia